Bebinca or bebinka, (Konkani; bibik) is a layer cake of Indo-Portuguese cuisine in Goa, India. In traditional baking, Bebinka has between 7 and 16 layers, but bakeries can modify the cake recipe as per convenience and taste. It is especially popular during the Christmas season, but is available all year round due to tourism in Goa. It is also easily available to carry and preserve for a long time or eaten fresh.

Bebinca was also adopted as a typhoon name in the northwestern Pacific Ocean by Macao. It is also prepared in Portugal and Mozambique.

Preparation 
Preparing bebinca is a slow process. The batter is made with flour, sugar, ghee, egg yolk, and coconut milk. The batter is spread thinly onto a grill and the layers are stacked atop one another. Bebinca may be garnished with nutmeg or slivered almonds.

See also

Pudvei
Koswad
Monti Fest
Bandra Fest
Feni (Goa)
Bombay Sapphire
Sanna (dish)
Tropical Storm Bebinca

References

Foods containing coconut
Goan cuisine
Indian desserts
Indian fusion cuisine
Portuguese fusion cuisine
Puddings
Indian cuisine
Christmas food